Neoliotomus is a genus of North American mammal from the Paleocene. It existed in the age immediately following the extinction of the last dinosaurs and was a member of the extinct order Multituberculata. It lies within the suborder Cimolodonta and the superfamily Ptilodontoidea. Other than that, its affinities are somewhat unclear.

The genus Neoliotomus ("new Liotomus") was named by Jepsen G.L. in 1930, and is also known as Eucosmodon (partly).

Species
The species Neoliotomus conventus, named by Jepsen G.L. in 1930, is known from the Clarkforkian (Paleocene) DeBeque Formation of Wyoming and of the Fort Union Formation of Montana and Colorado, (United States). This is a fairly large multituberculate of around 1.9 kg. The holotype is in the Peabody Museum of Natural History at Yale University.

The species Neoliotomus ultimus was named by Granger W. and Simpson G.G. in 1928. It has also been known as Eucosmodon ultimus (Granger & Simpson, 1928). Fossil remains were found in Clarkforkian (Paleocene) strata of Wyoming and Colorado. This species is known from a fair number of locations. It is another large multituberculate, which weighed perhaps 2 kg.

References 
 Jepsen (1930), "New vertebrate fossils from the Lower Eocene of the Bighorn Basin, Wyoming." Proc. Amer. Philos. Soc. 69, p. 117-131, 4 pls.
 Kielan-Jaworowska Z & Hurum JH (2001), "Phylogeny and Systematics of multituberculate mammals." Paleontology 44, p. 389-429.
 Much of this information has been derived from MESOZOIC MAMMALS; Ptilodontoidea, an Internet directory.

Ptilodontoids
Paleocene mammals
Paleocene genus extinctions
Extinct mammals of North America
Prehistoric mammal genera